Donald Dexter Griner (March 7, 1888 – June 3, 1950) was a pitcher in Major League Baseball. He pitched from 1912 to 1918.

External links

1888 births
1950 deaths
Baseball players from Tennessee
Brooklyn Robins players
Cleveland Counts players
Fulton Railroaders players
Major League Baseball pitchers
Minor league baseball managers
People from Centerville, Tennessee
St. Louis Cardinals players
St. Paul Saints (AA) players